Conchobar an Abaidh Ó Cellaigh, king of Uí Maine, Chief of the Name, died 1403.

Following a lengthy period of stable rule from c.1349 to 1402 under the kings William Buidhe and his son, Maelsechlainn, Conchobar's reign was the first of two successive short reigns, though it is unclear if succession disputes were the cause of it.

Conchobar was a son of Maelsechlainn, and nickname an Abaidh because he was an abbot at an Ui Maine monastery. The Annals of the Four Masters report his death as follows:

Conor Anabaidh, the son of Melaghlin O'Kelly, Lord of Hy-Many, the Serpent of his tribe, and of all the Irish people, died, after Extreme Unction and Penance, and was interred in the monastery of St. John the Baptist in Tir-Many.

Notes

External links
http://www.ucc.ie/celt/published/T100005D/

Further reading

 The Tribes and customs of Hy-Many, John O'Donovan, 1843
 The Parish of Ballinasloe, Fr. Jerome A. Fahey.
 The Surnames of Ireland, Edward MacLysaght, Dublin, 1978.
 A New History of Ireland - lists and genealogies, vol. 9, Oxford University Press, 1984.

People from County Galway
People from County Roscommon
15th-century Irish monarchs
Conchobar An Abaidh
Kings of Uí Maine